Battle of Berlin can refer to:

 Battle of Berlin, the final strategic offensives of the European Theatre of World War II
 Battle of Berlin (air), the bombing campaign on Berlin by the Royal Air Force (RAF) from November 1943 to March 1944
1757 raid on Berlin, an occupation of Berlin by the Army of the Holy Roman Empire during the Seven Years' War
 Raid on Berlin, a 1760 occupation of Berlin by Austrian and Russian forces during the Seven Years' War

Films
 Battle of Berlin (film), a 1973 West German documentary film directed by Franz Baake and Jost von Morr
 The Fall of Berlin (film), a 1950 two-part Soviet film directed by Mikheil Chiaureli.